El sueño del Mara'akame (Mara'akame's Dream) is a 2016 Mexican drama film, directed and written by Federico Cecchetti. The film plot is about a young boy who dreams to travel to Mexico City to play with his band, but his father, a Mara'akame (chaman hichol), has a different plan for his future. The film premiered at the 14th Morelia International Film Festival and was awarded Best First of Second Mexican Feature Film.

El sueño del Mara'akame received 12 nominations for the 59th Ariel Awards, including Best Picture and Best Director. It won two, for Best Original Music and Best First Work.

Cast
Luciano Bautista (Maxa Temai)
Inocencio de la Cruz Domínguez
Cruz de la Cruz
Paly Omar Ezequiel
Patricio Fernández
Pascual Hernández
Antonio Parra (Haka Temai)
Mariana Treviño

Accolades

External links

References

2016 films
2016 drama films
Mexican drama films
2010s Spanish-language films
2010s Mexican films